William Forbes (1806 – ) was a British Conservative politician.

Forbes was elected Conservative MP for Stirlingshire at the 1835 general election. However, after winning the seat again at the 1837 general election, he was unseated on petition in favour of George Abercromby in 1838, after at least one vote had been wrongly ascribed to the wrong candidate. He later regained the seat, at the 1841 general election, and held it until his death in 1855.

References

External links
 

Members of the Parliament of the United Kingdom for Stirling constituencies
Scottish Tory MPs (pre-1912)
UK MPs 1835–1837
UK MPs 1837–1841
UK MPs 1841–1847
UK MPs 1847–1852
UK MPs 1852–1857
1806 births
1855 deaths